Fairfield County is a county in the southwestern corner of the U.S. state of Connecticut. It is the most populous county in the state and was also its fastest-growing from 2010 to 2020. As of the 2020 census, the county's population was 957,419, representing 26.6% of Connecticut's overall population. The closest to the center of the New York metropolitan area, the county contains four of the state's top 7 largest cities—Bridgeport (1st), Stamford (2nd), Norwalk (6th), and Danbury (7th)—whose combined population of 433,368 is nearly half the county's total population.

The United States Office of Management and Budget has designated Fairfield County as the Bridgeport-Stamford-Norwalk-Danbury metropolitan statistical area.  The United States Census Bureau ranked the metropolitan area as the 59th most populous metropolitan statistical area of the United States in 2019. The U.S. Office of Management and Budget has further designated the metropolitan statistical area as a component of the more extensive New York-Newark-Bridgeport, NY-NJ-CT-PA combined statistical area, the most populous combined statistical area and primary statistical area of the United States.

As is the case with all eight of Connecticut's counties, there is no county government and no county seat. As an area, it is only a geographical point of reference. In Connecticut, the cities and towns are responsible for all local governmental activities including fire and rescue, schools, and snow removal; in a few cases, neighboring towns will share certain resources. The last county seat was Bridgeport, which had served this role from 1853 until 1960.

Fairfield County's Gold Coast helped rank it sixth in the U.S. in per-capita personal income by the Bureau of Economic Analysis in 2005, contributing substantially to Connecticut being one of the most affluent states in the U.S. Other communities are more densely populated and economically diverse than the affluent areas for which the county is better known.

History
Fairfield County was the home of many Native American tribes prior to the Europeans' arrival. People of the Schaghticoke tribe lived in the area of present-day New Fairfield and Sherman. From east to west the Wappinger sachemships included the Paugussetts, Tankiteke, and the Siwanoy. There were also Paquioque and Potatuck inhabitants of Fairfield County.

The Dutch explorer Adriaen Block explored coastal Connecticut in the Spring and early Summer of 1614 in the North America-built vessel Onrust. The first European settlers of the county, however, were Puritans and Congregationalists from England. Roger Ludlow (1590–1664), one of the founders of the Colony of Connecticut, helped to purchase and charter the towns of Fairfield (1639) and Norwalk (purchased 1640, chartered as a town in 1651). Ludlow is credited as having chosen the name Fairfield. Fairfield is a descriptive name referring to the beauty of its fields. The town of Stratford was settled in 1639 as well by Adam Blakeman (1596–1665). William Beardsley (1605–1661) was also one of the first settlers of Stratford in 1639.

Fairfield County was established by an act of the Connecticut General Court in Hartford along with Hartford County, New Haven County, and New London County; which were the first four Connecticut counties, on May 10, 1666. From transcriptions of the Connecticut Colonial Records for that day:
This Court orders that from the east bounds of Stratford
to ye bounds of Rye shalbe for future one County wch
shalbe called the County of Fairfield.  And it is ordered
that the County Court shalbe held at Fairfield on the second
Tuesday in March and the first Tuesday of November
yearely. (sic)

The original Fairfield County consisted of the towns of Rye, Greenwich, Stamford, Norwalk, Fairfield, and Stratford. In 1673, the town of Woodbury was incorporated and added to Fairfield County. In 1683, New York and Connecticut reached a final agreement regarding their common border. This resulted in the cession of the town of Rye and all claims to the Oblong to New York. From the late 17th to early 18th centuries, several new towns were incorporated in western Connecticut and added to Fairfield County, namely Danbury (1687), Ridgefield (1709), Newtown (1711), and New Fairfield (1740). In 1751, Litchfield County was constituted, taking over the town of Woodbury. The final boundary adjustment to Fairfield County occurred in 1788 when the town of Brookfield was incorporated from parts of Newtown, Danbury, and New Milford, with Fairfield County gaining territory from Litchfield County.

Other early county inhabitants include:
Joseph Hawley (born 1603 in England; died 1690), who had emigrated to America in 1629 and then settled in Stratford in 1650, later becoming Stratford's first town clerk.  Joseph Hawley's son Ephraim built the Ephraim Hawley House in 1683 in Trumbull that is still standing and serves as a private residence.
Thomas Fitch ( 1700–1774), from Norwalk, was a governor of the Colony of Connecticut.
Gold Selleck Silliman (1732–1790) of the town of Fairfield fought for the Americans during the American Revolutionary War and rose to the rank of brigadier general by 1776. He fought in the New York campaign that year.

During the Revolutionary War, Connecticut's prodigious agricultural output led to it being known informally as "the Provisions State". In the spring of 1777, the British Commander-in-Chief, North America General William Howe, in New York City, ordered William Tryon to interrupt the flow of supplies from Connecticut that were reaching the Continental Army. Tryon and Henry Duncan led a fleet of 26 ships carrying 2,000 men to Westport's Compo Beach to raid Continental Army supply depots in Danbury on April 22, 1777. American Major General David Wooster (1710–1777), who was born in Stratford, was in charge of the stores at Danbury and defended them with a force of only 700 troops. Two years later during a British raid on Greenwich on February 26, 1779 General Israel Putnam, who had stayed at Knapp's Tavern the previous night, rode away on his horse to warn the people of Stamford. Putnam was shot at by the British raiders but was able to escape. The hat he was wearing with a musket ball hole in it is on display at Knapp's Tavern in Greenwich (which is commonly, albeit somewhat erroneously, called Putnam's cottage). In the summer of 1779, General William Tryon sought to punish Americans by attacking civilian targets in coastal Connecticut with a force of about 2,600 British troops. New Haven was raided on July 5, Fairfield was raided on the 7th and burned. Norwalk was raided on July 10 and burned on the 11th. Norwalk militia leader Captain Stephen Betts put up resistance to the invaders, but was overwhelmed by the powerful British raiders and was forced to retreat.

David Sherman Boardman (1786–1864) was a prominent early lawyer and judge in this and neighboring Litchfield County.

On October 7, 1801, Neheemiah Dodge and other members of the Danbury Baptist Association wrote a letter to then-president Thomas Jefferson expressing their concern that as Baptists they may not be able to express full religious liberty in the state of Connecticut whose "ancient charter" was adopted before the establishment of a Baptist church in the state. Jefferson replied in a letter to Dodge and the other members of the Danbury church on January 1, 1802, in which he stated that the First Amendment to the United States Constitution provided "a wall of separation between church and State" that protected them.

An agricultural region, the first railroad was the Housatonic Railroad, construction started 1836 and ended 1840, extending from Bridgeport to New Milford originally, connecting Litchfield County crops to the port in Bridgeport, by passing New York City. The New York and New Haven railroad along the county's coast was constructed in the late 1840s, which started in New York City and ended in New Haven, connecting Bridgeport, Stamford, Norwalk and all the towns on the coast.

In 1851, the county seat of Fairfield County was moved from the town of Fairfield to the newly founded neighboring city of Bridgeport.  This was due to its growing population and industry as the old courthouse erected 1794 was no longer adequate. The first hospital in the county, and the 3rd hospital in Connecticut behind Hartford and New Haven Hospitals, Bridgeport Hospital was founded in 1884 along with Fairfield County's first nursing school. It would be soon followed by Danbury Hospital (1885), Norwalk Hospital (1893), Stamford Hospital (1896)  Greenwich Hospital (1903),St. Vincent's Hospital in Bridgeport (1903), and Park City Hospital in Bridgeport (1926), which closed in 1993.

By 1900, the largest cities in the county were Bridgeport, Norwalk, Danbury, Stamford  and Greenwich. By 1905, Bridgeport had become the principle manufacturing center in the state, and one of the major manufacturers in the New England region behind Boston, Providence, and Worcester, with $44,586,519 total worth of products manufactured without adjusting to today's money. Stamford and Greenwich had become popular resort towns for New York City's wealthy.

Connecticut in 1905 was 11th in the United States terms of industrial goods produced, and Fairfield County contained the city with the most total worth of products made, Bridgeport. One-fifth of Connecticut's population was employed in manufacturing, the state's largest industry which generated most of its wealth. Bridgeport in 1905 produced 20% of America's corsets. The 2nd largest city in Connecticut behind New Haven by 1910, Bridgeport's population grew by 50,000 people during the first 20 months of US involvement during the First World War, producing 50% of Allied ammunition during that time. Bridgeport by 1920 had a population of 143,555 people, then the 44th largest US city. Danbury, in northern Fairfield County, was known as the "Hat City", producing 20% of America's hats, until the industry began to decline in the 1920s. Stamford (population 40,067 in 1920), was known as the "Lock City", as the home of the Yale and Towne Lock Manufacturing Company.  Bridgeport, nicknamed "Park City" had in 1930  over 500 factories within its borders. Bridgeport Machines, Inc., a milling machine manufacturer, was founded in Bridgeport in 1938, as well as Hubbell Incorporated in the 1890s, these are two examples, various companies were headquartered in Bridgeport, such as Warnerco, ACME Shear, Westinghouse subsidiary Bryant Electric among others, and others such as Remington Arms, General Electric, Singer Sewing Machines, Sikorsky Aircraft, Carpenter Steel, and countless others, had large scale manufacturing complexes there.

Most of the county remained agricultural. Westport in the 1920s was a bohemian summer artist colony, and was home to famous artists, writers, and painters, such as F. Scott Fitzgerald, who spent a summer in town. The Cos Cob art colony flourished from the late 1800s to the 1920s.

At the height of its influence in the 1920s, the Ku Klux Klan had a distinct presence in the county and county politics. The group was most active in Darien, but had small chapters in Norwalk, Stamford, and Bridgeport. The Klan has since disappeared from the county.

The county's first institution of higher learning was Western Connecticut State University, founded in Danbury in 1903 (known by its acronym, WCSU), followed by the University of Bridgeport in 1927, Fairfield University in neighboring Fairfield in 1947 and Sacred Heart University.

Nearly one-third of Fairfield County's population lived within Bridgeport's city limits in 1950, 31.5%. The city began to decline in population as families moved into nearby suburbs, such as Fairfield, leading to widespread residential development. Bridgeport slowly began to loose jobs and large corporations moved into southern states or outside the country. The city gained a reputation for having an aging industrial image, what New York Times articles described as a smokestack filled, aging view of the city from the highway. The Connecticut Turnpike (Interstate 95) was built in the mid-1950s along the coast, joining the scenic Merrit Parkway, built in the late 1930s to alleviate traffic on the Post Road, and built further inland away from population centers. Towns such as Westport, Darian, New Caanan, Stamford, and Greenwich became New York City suburbs, forming the Connecticut Gold Coast,
Fairfield County, along with all other Connecticut counties, was abolished as a governmental agency in accord with state legislation that took effect October 1, 1960. The first enclosed shopping malls in Fairfield County were Trumbull Shopping Park (1963), in the bedroom community of Trumbull just outside Bridgeport, the now gone Lafayette Shopping Park (1965) in Bridgeport, replaced downtown blocks that were demolished as part of the city's urban renewal, Danbury Fair Mall (1968) on the former fairgrounds of the annual Danbury Fair, Hawley Lane Mallin Trumbull (1971) and the Stamford Town Center (1982) as part of the urban renewal project in downtown Stamford.

Stamford, Connecticut, is an example of edge cityurbanization. Stamford in the 1960s was a residential suburb of New York City, with a few industries and research laboratories, but of Stamford's downtown was razed and rebuilt it with modern skyscrapers, and several major corporations moved their headquarters to Stamford, creating one of the largest corporate concentrations in the United States. Originally a more moderate plan, entire downtown blocks and streets were demolished in slow phases and replaced with office towers, residential towers and the Stamford Town Center shopping mall courtesy of the F.D. Rich Company, which was hired by the city to redevelop what was described as the aging, deteriorating downtown, throughout the 60s, 70s and early 80s. Stamford's population grew from 92,713 in 1960 to 135,470
people in 2020, making it the 2nd largest city in Connecticut in 2022 (behind Bridgeport), surpassing New Haven.

Geography

Land

The terrain of the county trends from flat near the coast to hilly and higher near its northern extremity. The highest elevation is 1,290 feet (393 m) above sea level along the New York state line south of Branch Hill in the Town of Sherman; the lowest point is sea level itself.

The Taconic Mountains and the Berkshire Mountains ranges of the Appalachian Mountains run through Fairfield County. The Taconics begin roughly in Ridgefield and the Berkshires begin roughly in Northern Trumbull, both running north to Litchfield County and beyond. A portion of the Taconics also is in rural Greenwich and rural North Stamford in Fairfield County and run north into Westchester County, New York, eventually re-entering Fairfield County in Ridgefield. A small portion of the Appalachian Trail runs through Fairfield County; the trail enters Connecticut in the northernmost and least populous town in the county, Sherman, and moves east into Litchfield County, which encompasses the majority of the Appalachian Trail in Connecticut.

The section of the Taconic Mountains range that runs through Greenwich and North Stamford of Fairfield County is also the part of the Appalachians that is closest to the coast out of the entire Appalachian Mountains.

Water
The eastern limit is mostly a natural border defined as the halfway point of the Housatonic River with New Haven County with the exception of several islands belonging wholly to Stratford.

The county hosts or contains the rivers Byram, Housatonic, Mianus, Mill, Norwalk, Pequonnock, Rippowam, Saugatuck, and Still.

Pollution
The Still River is polluted with mercury nitrate from the hat industry in Danbury, also thereafter diluting into the Housatonic River and Long Island Sound.

The Housatonic is residually polluted with Monsanto chemicals called Aroclor, polychlorinated biphenyls, or PCBs. From  until 1977, the river received PCB pollution discharges from the General Electric plant at Pittsfield, Massachusetts.

Mountains and summits
Refer to List of Mountains and Summits in Fairfield County, Connecticut.

Adjacent counties
Litchfield County (north)
New Haven County (east)
Westchester County, New York (southwest)
Putnam County, New York (west)
Dutchess County, New York (northwest)
Nassau County, New York (south)

National protected areas
 Stewart B. McKinney National Wildlife Refuge (part)
 Weir Farm National Historic Site

Major highways

Demographics

2000 census
As of the census of 2000, there were 882,567 people, 324,232 households, and 228,259 families residing in the county. The racial makeup of the county was 79.31% White, 10.01% Black or African American, 0.20% Native American, 3.25% Asian, 0.04% Pacific Islander, 4.70% from other races, and 2.49% from two or more races.  11.88% of the population were Hispanic or Latino of any race. 17.6% were of Italian, 12.4% Irish, 6.5% German and 6.4% English ancestry.

In 2010, 66.2% of Fairfield County's population was non-Hispanic whites and 10.8% of the population was black.  Asians were 4.6% of the population.  Hispanics now constituted 16.9% of the population.

As of 2000, 76.2% spoke English, 11.0% Spanish, 2.0% Portuguese, 1.7% Italian and 1.1% French as their first language.  Some of the last group were Haitians, although other Haitians would identify Haitian Creole as their first language.

There were 324,232 households, out of which 34.20% had children under the age of 18 living with them, 55.50% were married couples living together, 11.50% had a female householder with no husband present, and 29.60% were non-families. 24.00% of all households were made up of individuals, and 9.40% had someone living alone who was 65 years of age or older.  The average household size was 2.67 and the average family size was 3.18.

In the county, the population was spread out, with 25.60% under the age of 18, 7.00% from 18 to 24, 30.90% from 25 to 44, 23.30% from 45 to 64, and 13.30% who were 65 years of age or older.  The median age was 37 years. For every 100 females, there were 93.40 males.  For every 100 females age 18 and over, there were 89.60 males.

The median income for a household in the county was $65,249, and the median income for a family was $77,690. Males had a median income of $51,996 versus $37,108 for females. The per capita income for the county was $38,350.  About 5.00% of families and 6.90% of the population were below the poverty line, including 8.30% of those under age 18 and 6.60% of those age 65 or over.

2010 census
As of the 2010 United States census, there were 916,829 people, 335,545 households, and 232,896 families residing in the county. The racial makeup of the county was 74.8% white, 10.8% black or African American, 4.6% Asian, 0.3% American Indian, 6.8% from other races, and 2.6% from two or more races. Those of Hispanic or Latino origin made up 16.9% of the population. In terms of ancestry, 18.1% were Italian, 15.9% were Irish, 9.8% were German, 8.7% were English, 5.5% were Polish, and 2.7% were American.

Of the 335,545 households, 36.4% had children under the age of 18 living with them, 53.1% were married couples living together, 12.3% had a female householder with no husband present, 30.6% were non-families, and 24.9% of all households were made up of individuals. The average household size was 2.68 and the average family size was 3.21. The median age was 39.5 years.

The median income for a household in the county was $81,268 and the median income for a family was $100,593. Males had a median income of $70,187 versus $50,038 for females. The per capita income for the county was $48,295. About 5.6% of families and 8.0% of the population were below the poverty line, including 9.4% of those under age 18 and 6.4% of those age 65 or over.

Demographic breakdown by town

Income

Data is from the 2010 United States Census and the 2006–2010 American Community Survey 5-Year Estimates.

Race
Data is from the 2007–2011 American Community Survey 5-Year Estimates, ACS Demographic and Housing Estimates, "Race alone or in combination with one or more other races."

Economy
In the late 1960s and early 1970s, corporations began moving their headquarters to Fairfield County from Manhattan; Thomas J. Lueck of The New York Times said that the trend "permanently decentralized big business in the New York region." During the 1980s many buyouts and reorganizations and an economic recession lead to companies vacating much of the suburban office space in Fairfield County. In 1992 Fairfield County had the headquarters of over 25 major multinational corporations, giving it the third largest concentration of those companies in the United States after New York City and Chicago.

Recently, Fairfield County has been described as a "hedge fund ghetto" due to the large concentration of investment management firms in the area, most notably Bridgewater Associates (one of the world's largest hedge fund companies), Aladdin Capital Management, and Point72 Asset Management.

Fairfield County is the top location for aquaculture in the state.

Government and municipal services
As of 1960, counties in Connecticut do not have any associated county government structure. Thus Fairfield County is only a geographical point of reference. All municipal services are provided by the towns, who sometimes will share certain resources through regionalization. In order to address issues concerning more than one town, several regional agencies that help coordinate the towns for infrastructure, land use, and economic development concerns have been established. Within the geographical area of Fairfield County, the regional agencies are:

 Greater Bridgeport
 South Western
 The Valley (partly in New Haven County)
 Housatonic Valley (partly in Litchfield County)

County municipal buildings
Several former county municipal buildings are used by other state or local agencies, including:

 The Fairfield County Jail in Bridgeport on the corner of North Avenue and Madison Avenue, still actively used to house prisoners.
 The Fairfield County Court Houses in Bridgeport and Danbury which served the county's judicial needs and housed county deputy sheriff's until December 2000. The court houses are still marked "Fairfield County Court House".

Law enforcement

Law enforcement within the geographic area of the county is provided by the respective town police departments, whereas in other states in the region such as New York and Vermont law enforcement would be provided by the local county sheriff's department. In the less dense areas, such as Sherman, law enforcement is primarily provided by the Connecticut State Police. Prior to 2000, a County Sheriff's Department existed for the purpose of executing judicial warrants, prisoner transport, court security, Bailiff, and county and state executions. These responsibilities have now been taken over by the Connecticut State Marshal System.

Some municipalities in the county still maintain a sheriff's department to fill the void of the abolishment of the county sheriff's department, such as the City of Shelton which has established the Shelton Sheriff's Department to carry out warrants in the city.

Judicial
The geographic area of the county is served by the three separate judicial districts: Danbury, Stamford-Norwalk, and Fairfield. Each judicial district has a superior court located, respectively, in Danbury, Stamford, and Bridgeport. Each judicial district has one or more geographical area courts ("GA"'s), subdivisions of the judicial districts that handle lesser cases such as criminal misdemeanors, small claims, traffic violations, and other civil actions.

Fire protection
Fire protection in the county is provided by the towns. Several towns also have fire districts that provide services to a section of the town.

Education

Education in the county is usually provided by the town governments. The exceptions are the towns of Redding and Easton at the secondary level, as those two joined to form a regional secondary school district (Region 9).

School districts include:

K-12:

 Bethel School District
 Bridgeport School District
 Brookfield School District
 Danbury School District
 Darien School District
 Fairfield School District
 Greenwich School District
 Monroe School District
 New Canaan School District
 New Fairfield School District
 Newtown School District
 Norwalk School District
 Ridgefield School District
 Shelton School District
 Stamford School District
 Stratford School District
 Trumbull School District
 Weston School District
 Westport School District
 Wilton School District

Secondary:
 Regional High School District 09

Elementary:
 Easton School District
 Redding School District
 Sherman School District

Private schools:
Convent of the Sacred Heart
Eagle Hill School
Greenwich Academy
Greenwich Country Day School
Immaculate High School
Japanese School of New York (Greenwich Japanese School)
Stanwich School
Whitby School
Wooster School

Closed schools:
Carmel Academy
Curtis School for Boys

Crime rate
Fairfield County has a low crime index of 2050.2 (per 100,000 citizens) as well as a murder closure rate of over 70%. Several Governmental agencies, as well as private security contractors, have made note of Fairfield's low crime rates and the county currently has 6 cities and towns with a percentile safety index of 90% or higher compared to the rest of the continental United States (based on violent and property crimes).

Politics
As with neighboring Westchester County, Fairfield County was generally a Republican stronghold for much of the 20th century. Urban municipalities such as Stamford, Norwalk and Bridgeport trended Democratic, while the suburban and rural enclaves tended to lean Republican. However, during the 1990s, these latter areas began to increasingly shift towards Democratic candidates. Today, only Hartford County has a higher concentration of Democratic voters. The last time the county voted for a Republican presidential candidate was in 1992 for George H.W Bush.

|}

Hospitals
Bridgeport Hospital
Danbury Hospital
Greenwich Hospital
Norwalk Hospital
St. Vincent's Medical Center (Bridgeport) in Bridgeport
Stamford Hospital

Transportation

Mass transit
With Interstate 95 and the Merritt Parkway increasingly clogged with traffic, state officials are looking toward mass transit to ease the county's major thoroughfares' traffic burden.

New office buildings are being concentrated near railroad stations in Stamford, Bridgeport and other municipalities in the county to allow for more rail commuting. Proximity to Stamford's Metro-North train station was cited by the Royal Bank of Scotland as a key reason for locating its new U.S. headquarters building in downtown Stamford; construction on the office tower started in late 2006.

Air
Within Fairfield County there are two regional airports: Igor I. Sikorsky Memorial Airport in Stratford and the Danbury Municipal Airport in Danbury.
The county is also served by larger airports such as Bradley International Airport, John F. Kennedy International Airport, LaGuardia Airport, Newark Liberty International Airport, Tweed New Haven Regional Airport, and Westchester County Airport.

Bus service
Connecticut Transit's Stamford division runs local and inter-city buses to the southern part of the county.
The Norwalk Transit District serves the Norwalk area in the southern central portion of the county; the Greater Bridgeport Transit Authority serves Bridgeport and eastern Fairfield County; and the Housatonic Area Regional Transit agency serves Danbury and the northern portions of the county.

Ferry service
The Bridgeport & Port Jefferson Ferry carries passengers and cars from Bridgeport to Port Jefferson, New York, across Long Island Sound.

Ferry lines in and out of Stamford are also in development.

Rail
Commuter Rail is perhaps Fairfield County's most important transportation artery, as it allows its residents an efficient ride to Grand Central Terminal in New York City. Service is provided on Metro-North's New Haven Line, and every town on the shoreline has at least one station. Connecting lines bring service to New Canaan from Stamford on the New Canaan Branch, and to Danbury from South Norwalk on the Danbury Branch. Many trains run express from New York to Stamford, making it an easy 45-minute ride.

In the 2005 and 2006 sessions of the Legislature, massive appropriations were made to buy replacements for the 343 rail cars for the Metro-North New Haven Line and branch lines. The approximately 30-year-old cars will be replaced with new cars at a rate of ten per month starting in 2010.

Bridgeport and Stamford are also served by Amtrak, and both cities see a significant number of boardings on the Northeast Regional route (Boston to Newport News, VA). This route also serves other Amtrak stations in Connecticut, including New Haven, Old Saybrook, New London, and Mystic.

Major roads

Boston Post Road
U.S. 1 is the oldest east–west route in the county, running through all of its shoreline cities and towns. Known by various names along its length, most commonly "Boston Post Road" or simply "Post Road", it gradually gains latitude from west to east. Thus, U.S. 1 west is officially designated "South" and east is "North".

Though contiguous, U.S. 1 changes name by locality. In Greenwich it is Putnam Avenue. In Stamford, it becomes Main Street or Tresser Boulevard. In Darien, it is Boston Post Road or "the Post Road". In Norwalk, it is Connecticut Avenue in the west, Van Zant St, Cross St, and North Av in the center, and Westport Avenue in the east. In Westport, it is Post Road West from the Norwalk town line until the Saugatuck River, where it becomes Post Road East until Fairfield. In Fairfield, it is again Boston Post Road or "the Post Road". In Bridgeport, it follows Kings Highway in the west, North Avenue in the center, and Boston Avenue in the east. Finally, it becomes Barnum Avenue in Stratford.

Interstate 95
The western portions of Interstate 95 in Connecticut are known as the Connecticut Turnpike or the Governor John Davis Lodge Turnpike in Fairfield County and it crosses the state approximately parallel to U.S. Route 1. The road is most commonly referred to as "I-95". The highway is six lanes (sometimes eight lanes) throughout the county. It was completed in 1958 and is often clogged with traffic particularly during morning and evening rush hours.

With the high cost of land along the Gold Coast, state lawmakers do not consider widening the highway to be fiscally feasible, although occasional stretches between entrances and nearby exits are now sometimes connected with a fourth "operational improvement" lane (for instance, westbound between the Exit 10 interchange in Darien and Exit 8 in Stamford).

Merritt Parkway
The Merritt Parkway, also known as "The Merritt" or Connecticut Route 15, is a truck-free scenic parkway that runs through the county parallel and generally several miles north of Interstate 95. It begins at the New York state line, where it is the Hutchinson River Parkway, and terminates on the Igor I. Sikorsky Memorial Bridge, where it becomes the Wilbur Cross Parkway at the New Haven county line.

The interchange between the Merritt Parkway and Route 7 in Norwalk was completed around the year 2000. The project was held up in a lawsuit won by preservationists concerned about the historic Merritt Parkway bridges. It is now exit 39 off the Merritt, and exit 15 off I-95. The parkway is a National Scenic Byway and is listed on the National Register of Historic Places.

Interstate 84
Interstate 84, which runs through Danbury, is scheduled to be widened to a six-lane highway at all points between Danbury and Waterbury. State officials say they hope the widening will not only benefit drivers regularly on the route but also entice some cars from the more crowded Interstate 95, which is roughly parallel to it. Heavier trucks are unlikely to use Interstate 84 more often, however, because the route is much hillier than I-95 according to a state Department of Transportation official.

U.S. Route 7
With its southern terminus at Interstate 95 in central Norwalk, U.S. Route 7 heads north through Wilton, Ridgefield, Danbury, and Brookfield to points north. In Danbury and almost all of Norwalk, the route is a highway (known as "Super 7" in the Danbury area or "The Connector" in Norwalk) but it becomes a four-lane road just south of the Wilton-Norwalk border and up to Danbury. There is significant opposition to making the route a limited access highway for the entire length by residents of Wilton and Ridgefield. As a compromise between freeway supporters and opponents, the Connecticut Department of Transportation is upgrading the existing 2-lane section to 4 lanes, with a median in some locations. The state has also bypassed the original 2-lane Route 7 around Brookfield with a freeway, where town officials have long supported an expressway to divert traffic away from the town center.

Connecticut Route 8
Route 8 terminates in downtown Bridgeport from I-95 with Connecticut Route 25 and goes north. It splits from Connecticut Route 25 at the Bridgeport—Trumbull town line and continues north into southeastern Trumbull and Shelton, then beyond the county through some of towns of the Naugatuck River Valley to Waterbury and beyond. Construction of the route provided some impetus for the creation of office parks in Shelton and home construction there and in other parts of The Valley.

Connecticut Route 25
Route 25 starts in downtown Bridgeport from I 95 with Route 8 and goes north. It splits from Connecticut Route 8 at the Bridgeport—Trumbull town line and continues into Trumbull.  The limited access divided expressway ends in northern Trumbull, but Route 25 continues into Monroe, Newtown, and Brookfield.

Sports

Teams that previously called Fairfield County their home include the Connecticut Wildcats of USA Rugby League, the Danbury Whalers and the Danbury Titans of the Federal Hockey League, and the Bridgeport Bluefish in baseball's independent Atlantic League. In addition, being a part of metropolitan New York City, the major professional sports teams of New York State and New Jersey are local teams to Connecticut.

Communities

Note: Villages are named localities within towns, but have no separate corporate existence from the towns they are in.

Bethel (town)
Stony Hill
Bridgeport (city, former county seat)
Beardsly
Black Rock
Barnum (P.T.)
Grover Hill
Broadbridge
Brooklawn
Downtown
East End
East Side
Hollow
Lake Forest
Little Italy
Mill Hill
Newfield
North Bridgeport
North End
Trumbull Gardens (Terrace)
Ox Hill
South End
Marina Village
Seaside Park
University of Bridgeport Campus
Steel Point
Success
West Side
Brookfield (town)
 Barkwood Falls
 Brookfield Center
 Brookfield Junction
 Brookfield Town Center
 Candlewood Lake Club
 Candlewood Orchards
 Candlewood Shores
 East Iron Works
 Huckleberry Hill
 Iron Works
 Long Meadow Hill
 Obtuse
 Pocono Ridge
 Prospect Hill
 West Iron Works
 Whisconier
Danbury (city)
Beaverbrook
Beckettville
Germantown
Great Plain
Little Brazil
Long Ridge
Mill Plain
Miry Brook
Darien (town)
Darien (Downtown)
Noroton
Noroton Heights
Tokeneke
Easton (town)
Aspetuck
Plattsville
Sport Hill
Fairfield (town)
Brooklawn
Fairfield Center (Downtown)
Greenfield Hill
Little Danbury (ghost town)
Mill Plain
Murray
Southport
Stratfield
Tunxis Hill
Greenwich (town)
Back Country
Belle Haven
Byram
Chickahominy
Cos Cob
Glenville
Greenwich (Downtown)
Indian Field
Mianus
Millbrook
Old Greenwich
Riverside
Rock Ridge
Round Hill
Sound Beach
Monroe (town)
East Village
Monroe Center
Stepney
Stevenson
Upper Stepney
New Canaan (town)
New Canaan Center
Silvermine (part)
New Fairfield (town)
Ball Pond
Bigelow Corners
Bogus Hill
Candlewood Corner
Candlewood Isle
Candlewood Knolls
Inglenook
Kellogg Point
Knollcrest
New Fairfield center
Sail Harbor
Taylor Corners
Newtown (town)
Berkshire
Botsford
Dodgingtown
Hattertown
Hawleyville
Newtown (incorporated borough)
Palestine
Sandy Hook
Norwalk (city)
Central Norwalk (Downtown)
Cranbury (Norwalk)
East Norwalk
Rowayton
Silvermine (part)
South Norwalk (SoNo)
Spring Hill
Wall Street
West Norwalk
Redding (town)
Five Points
Georgetown (part)
Redding Center
Redding Ridge
Topstone
West Redding
Ridgefield (town)
Branchville
Lakes East
Lakes West
Mamanasco Lake
Ridgebury
Ridgefield
Route 7 Gateway
West Mountain
Shelton (city)
Birchbank
Booth Hill
Coram
Downtown
Huntington
Long Hill
Pine Rock Park
Sunnyside
The Maples
Trap Falls
Walnut Tree Hill
White Hills
Sherman (town)
Lakeside Woods
Sherman
Stamford (city)
Belltown
Bulls Head
Downtown
East Side
Glenbrook
Harbor Point
Newfield
North Stamford
Long Ridge
Richmond Hill
Roxbury
Shippan
Shippan Point
Springdale
South End
The Cove
Turn of River
West Side
Westover
Woodside
Stratford (town)
Hawley Lane
Lordship
Oronoque
Paradise Green
Putney
Stratford Center
Stratford Downtown
Success Hill
Trumbull (town)
Chestnut Hill
Daniels Farm
Long Hill
Nichols
Tashua
Trumbull Center
Weston (town)
Aspetuck (part)
Georgetown (part)
Weston village
Westport (Town)
Coleytown
Compo
Greens Farms
Old Hill
Poplar Plains
Saugatuck
Staples
Westport Village
Wilton (town)
Cannondale
Georgetown (most)
Silvermine (part)
South Wilton
Wilton Center

Telephone area codes
All communities in the county are in the area code 203/area code 475 overlay except for the town of Sherman which is in area code 860 and part of the geographical New Milford telephone exchange.

Major media in the county

Countywide
Fairfield County Weekly

Daily newspapers covering the county

Published within the county
The Advocate of Stamford – Stamford edition, published by Hearst Connecticut Media., a subsidiary of Hearst Communications.
The Advocate of Stamford – Norwalk edition
Connecticut Post, owned by Hearst Connecticut Media, published in Bridgeport, covers Eastern Fairfield County and the Naugatuck Valley.
The Hour (registration required), controlled by a trust under the ultimate authority of Norwalk Probate Court.
The News-Times of Danbury, owned by Hearst Communications, Inc.
The Fairfield County Business Journal, published by Westfair Communications Inc.
The Newtown Bee published in Newtown.
The Darien Times published in Darien.
The Redding Sentinel published in Redding
The Easton Courier covers Easton.

Spanish language newspapers
El Sol News, countywide, based in Stamford.
El Canillita, distributed across southwestern Connecticut.
Pluma Libre, distributed across southwestern Connecticut.

Other foreign language newspapers 
Haitian Voice, published in English, Haitian Creole and French, based in Bridgeport. 
BrazilNowUSA, covers stories from Fairfield County, Connecticut

Broadcast media and cable television
 Fairfield County is in the New York City TV market and receives its TV stations. Some TV stations in the Hartford-New Haven are also available to Fairfield County viewers.
 News 12 Connecticut has studios in Norwalk and covers Fairfield County as well as statewide news from Hartford.
 WFSB from Hartford maintains a secondary feed for Fairfield County on their fourth subchannel which is carried by area cable providers; it mainly offers differing advertising for local businesses, along with a different programming schedule to address syndicated programming which is claimed by New York City stations and would otherwise be blacked out on WFSB.

Colleges
 Housatonic Community College in Bridgeport
 University of Bridgeport in Bridgeport
 University of Connecticut Stamford campus
 Fairfield University in Fairfield
 Norwalk Community College
 St. Vincent's College in Bridgeport
 Sacred Heart University in Fairfield
 Western Connecticut State University in Danbury
 Lincoln Technical Institute in Shelton

Culture and the arts

Fine arts
 Franklin Street Works located in the downtown area of Stamford, Connecticut.
 The Housatonic Museum of Art located at Housatonic Community College in Bridgeport, Connecticut.

Music: orchestras in the county
Greater Bridgeport Symphony. Founded in 1945, its concerts are held at Klein Memorial Auditorium in Bridgeport
Connecticut Grand Opera, a not-for-profit, professional opera company founded in 1993 and based in Stamford
Danbury Symphony Orchestra
Greenwich Symphony Orchestra
Norwalk Symphony Orchestra, founded in 1939
Ridgefield Symphony Orchestra
Orchestra Lumos
 Western Connecticut Youth Orchestra, a not-for-profit organization providing young musicians in the Fairfield County and Upper Westchester County areas with a classical symphony experience

Other music and arts events
The Barnum Festival has been held in the Spring in Bridgeport since 1949 to raise money for charity
The Connecticut Film Festival is held in the Spring in Danbury
The Fairfield County Freestyle Championships are generally held once a semester on the campus of Sacred Heart University.  This event showcases the best freestyle dancers and rappers
The Gathering of the Vibes musical event has been held in Bridgeport's Seaside Park in 1999, 2000, 2007, and again in 2008
Musicals at Richter, held every summer in Danbury, is Connecticut's longest running outdoor theater
The Norwalk Oyster Festival is an annual fair in the city of Norwalk that features craft vendors and live music performances. The festival takes place on the first weekend after Labor Day in Veterans Park, near Long Island Sound

See also

 Historical U.S. Census Totals for Fairfield County, Connecticut
 List of Mountains and Summits in Fairfield County, Connecticut
 List of Registered Historic Places in Fairfield County, Connecticut

References

 

 
1666 establishments in Connecticut
1960 disestablishments in Connecticut
Counties in the New York metropolitan area
Populated places established in 1666